Bill Mitchell (born March 29, 1960) is an American politician who served as a three-time member of the Illinois House of Representatives.

Early life and education
Mitchell was born in Decatur, Illinois. He earned a Bachelor of Arts degree in political science from Eastern Illinois University in 1982.

Career 
Mitchell began his career as a Decatur City Councilman, Macon County Republican Chairman, and Mayor Pro Tem. During his time in local government, he supported curfew laws and made efforts to cut government waste, reduce taxes and institute juvenile justice reform.

In 2011, Mitchell joined with State Representative Adam Brown of the 101st district in proposing statehood for Cook County. Mitchell said that Chicago is "dictating its views" to the rest of the state and Brown added that Chicago "overshadows" the rest of Illinois.

An August 30, 2003, article in the Bloomington–Normal newspaper The Pantagraph stated that Mitchell was arrested for DUI near Heyworth, Illinois, and was also charged with improper traffic lane usage. The McLean County Sheriff's report indicated that his breath-alcohol level was 0.186 percent, which is more than twice Illinois legal BAC limit of 0.08. Mitchell pleaded guilty to both charges and was sentenced to 24 months of court supervision.

Mitchell retired after the 100th General Assembly and was succeeded by fellow Republican and Eastern Illinois University Trustee Dan Caulkins.

References

External links
Representative Bill Mitchell (R) 87th District at the Illinois General Assembly
By session: , 97th, 96th, 95th, 94th, 93rd
 
Bill Mitchell at Illinois House Republican Caucus

Republican Party members of the Illinois House of Representatives
1960 births
Living people
Mayors of Decatur, Illinois
Eastern Illinois University alumni
21st-century American politicians